Together is a Swedish comedy-drama film, which was released to cinemas in Sweden on 25 August 2000. It is Swedish director Lukas Moodysson's second full-length film.  Set in a Stockholm commune called "Tillsammans" (Swedish for "Together") in 1975, it is a satirical view of socialist values and a bittersweet comedy. Moodysson filmed a sequel titled Together 99 in 2022. It is set to be released in 2023.

Plot
Together is set in one of the sharehome communes that was created around Stockholm in the 1970s. Loosely led by the kind-natured Göran, who will do anything to avoid a conflict, the group spend their time arguing about left-wing politics and other more practical issues, such as whether doing the dishes is bourgeois. The sharehome's dynamics are significantly shaken when Göran's sister, Elisabeth, leaves her violent husband Rolf and moves in, bringing her two children Eva and Stefan.

Self-declared lesbian Anna lives in the commune with her ex-husband Lasse and their son Tet (named after the Tet offensive), who befriends Stefan. The two play games such as "torture the Pinochet victim" where, in the spirit of equality, they take turns at being Augusto Pinochet. Eva meanwhile befriends a lonely boy across the street named Fredrik; his family appears conventional on the surface but proves to be even more dysfunctional than the commune of which they so openly disapprove. The children are portrayed as sidelined by everyone in the film, from the new school where they are bullied to the parents who, while genuinely loving, are too busy experimenting with their own freedom to show it.

Elisabeth's husband Rolf makes a concerted effort to clean up his act, although not before getting drunk and arrested, leaving his children stranded on a roadside after a disastrous meal in a Chinese restaurant. Further relationship problems are found with Klas, who is desperately in love with Lasse, and between Göran and his selfish and immature girlfriend, who wants the benefits of an open relationship but not the responsibilities.

Selected cast
 Lisa Lindgren as Elisabeth
 Michael Nyqvist as Rolf, Elisabeth's husband
 Emma Samuelsson as Eva, Elisabeth's and Rolf's daughter
 Sam Kessel as Stefan, Elisabeth's and Rolf's son
 Gustaf Hammarsten as Göran, Elisabeth's brother
 Jessica Liedberg as Anna
 Ola Rapace (credited as Ola Norell) as Lasse
 Axel Zuber as Tet, Anna and Lasse's son
 Shanti Roney as Klas
 Olle Sarri as Erik Andersson
 Anja Lundqvist as Lena, Göran's girlfriend
 Sten Ljunggren as Birger
 Cecilia Frode as Signe
 Lars Frode as Sigvard
 Emil Moodysson as Måne
 Henrik Lundström as Fredrik

Production
Although set in Stockholm in eastern Sweden, the film was actually shot in western Sweden, mainly in cities Trollhättan and Gothenburg. Filming began on 27 October 1999 and wrapped 20 December 1999. Artist Carl Johan De Geer created the film's contemporary environments.

The character "Birger" previously appeared in Moodysson's short film 'Talk' (Bara prata lite) in 1997, where he was also played by Sten Ljunggren.

Reception

Critical reception
The film received critical acclaim. Rotten Tomatoes gives the film a score of 90% based on reviews from 79 critics, with an average rating of 7.2/10. The website's critical consensus reads "Managing to be both satirical and warm-hearted in its look at the inhabitants of a commune, Together successfully captures the spirit of a time." On Metacritic, the film has a weighted average score of 84 out of 100, based on 29 critics, indicating "universal acclaim".

The New York Times called Together "A funny, graceful and immensely good-natured work", while Salon described it as "The kind of picture that makes you feel that there are many good reasons to actually like mankind."

Box office
The film grossed $6.4 million in Sweden from 880,000 admissions. It grossed $1.3 million in Norway, $1 million in the United States and Canada and almost $1 million in the United Kingdom, for a worldwide total of $14.6 million.

Soundtrack
ABBA – "SOS"
Maggie Bell – "Caddo Queen"
Hoola Bandoola Band – "Vem kan man lita på?"
Pugh Rogefeldt – "Här kommer natten"
Ted Gärdestad – "Jag vill ha en egen måne"
Tony Hung – "Paddy Fields No. 1"
Peps Blodsband – "Onådens år"
Nazareth – "Love Hurts"
International Harvester – "It's Only Love"
Ted Gärdestad – "Så mycket bättre"
Bo Hansson – "The Black Riders (Flight to the Ford)"
Shit & Chanel – "Jorden Vinden Fuglene"
Shit & Chanel – "Fandango"
Bo Hansson – "Leaving Shire"
Nationalteatern – "Hanna från Arlöv"
Tony Hung – "Morning Stroll"
Bo Hansson – "At the House of Elrond and the Ring Goes South"
Marie Selander – "Vi är många"
Turid – "Song"
Ted Gärdestad – "Come Give Me Love"

Sequel
In 2022, Moodysson filmed a sequel to the film, titled Together 99. It is set to be released in 2023. The sequel is set in 1999 and follows Göran and Klas as they establish a new commune. Most of the actors returned, with the exception of the children, Michael Nyqvist, who passed away in 2017, and Ola Rapace, whose role of Lasse was recast with actor Jonas Karlsson.

References

External links

Together Movie Review

Films set in the 1970s
2000 films
2000 comedy-drama films
Danish comedy-drama films
Swedish comedy-drama films
Italian comedy-drama films
Films directed by Lukas Moodysson
Danish LGBT-related films
Swedish LGBT-related films
Italian LGBT-related films
2000s Swedish-language films
Zentropa films
2000 LGBT-related films
LGBT-related comedy-drama films
2000s Swedish films